Coenraad Bron (2 August 1937 – 15 August 2006) was a Dutch computer scientist. He worked with Edsger W. Dijkstra on the THE multiprogramming system. Together with Joep Kerbosch he invented the Bron–Kerbosch algorithm for the clique problem.

Born in Amsterdam, Bron read Chemistry at Utrecht University. After his graduation he moved to Eindhoven University where he started to work in Dijkstra's group. In 1972 he accepted an assistant professorship in Computing Science at Twente University, becoming a full professor there in 1980.

He died in Assen at age 69.

1937 births
2006 deaths
Dutch computer scientists
Scientists from Amsterdam
Utrecht University alumni
Academic staff of the University of Twente
Academic staff of the University of Groningen